Black Merda is the self-titled debut album by the Detroit rock band Black Merda. It was released in 1970 by Chess Records. The original album was long out of print before being reissued on CD by TuffCity Records in 1996. All of the album’s tracks are also collected on the 2005 Black Merda compilation The Folks from Mother's Mixer.

Track listing

 "Prophet" (A. Hawkins, V. Veasey) – 2:52
 "Think of Me" (A. Hawkins, V. Veasey, C. Hawkins, T. Hite) – 2:31
 "Cynthy-Ruth" (V. Veasey) – 3:03
 "Over and Over" (A. Hawkins, V. Veasey, C. Hawkins, T. Hite) – 5:29
 "Ashamed" (A. Hawkins, V. Veasey) – 3:50
 "Reality" (V. Veasey) – 1:59
 "Windsong" (A. Hawkins, V. Veasey, C. Hawkins, T. Hite) – 4:12
 "Good Luck" (A. Hawkins, V. Veasey) – 3:45
 "That’s the Way It Goes" (V. Veasey) – 3:15
 "I Don’t Want to Die" (A. Hawkins, V. Veasey, C. Hawkins, T. Hite) – 3:51
 "Set Me Free" (A. Hawkins, V. Veasey) – 0:28

Personnel
Anthony Hawkins – guitar, vocals
VC L. Veasey – bass guitar, vocals
Charles Hawkins – guitar, vocals
Tyrone Hite – drums, vocals

References

1970 debut albums
Black Merda albums
Chess Records albums